Tholocoleus is a monotypic moth genus of the family Erebidae described by Robinson in 1975. Its only species, Tholocoleus astrifer, was first described by Arthur Gardiner Butler in 1886. It is known from Fiji.

References

Herminiinae
Monotypic moth genera